Joseph Griffiths Masten (1809–1871) was Mayor of the City of Buffalo, New York, serving in 1843–1844 and 1845–1846.

Biography
He was born in Red Hook, New York on June 24, 1809. He graduated from Union College in 1828, then went on to study law and pass the bar. In 1836 Masten moved to Buffalo and established a law practice. He and his wife, the former Christina Cameron, were the first civilian owners of the Wilcox Mansion on Delaware Avenue.

He accepted nomination as a Democratic candidate for Mayor in 1843 and was elected March 7, 1843. During his first term, the office of comptroller was created; Buffalo's Irish immigrants celebrated their first St. Patrick's day; and the ordnance requiring that sidewalks and gutters be kept free from snow and dirt was adopted. In 1845 he sought and won a second mayoral term. On March 10, 1846, Masten's last term as Mayor of Buffalo ended.

From 1856 until his death in 1871, Masten held the position of superior court judge, joining George W. Clinton and Isaac Verplanck for the larger portion of that time. He also served as a Justice in the 8th Judicial District of the State of New York. He was a founding councilman for the Medical School that became the University at Buffalo. The Masten City Council district is named after him. He died on April 15, 1871, and is buried in Forest Lawn Cemetery

References

1809 births
1871 deaths
People from Red Hook, New York
Union College (New York) alumni
New York (state) lawyers
New York (state) Democrats
Mayors of Buffalo, New York
Burials at Forest Lawn Cemetery (Buffalo)
19th-century American politicians
19th-century American lawyers